General Hospital is an American television soap opera, airing on ABC. Created by Frank and Doris Hursley, the serial premiered on April 1, 1963. The longest-running cast member is Leslie Charleson, who has portrayed Monica Quartermaine since August 17, 1977, also making her one of the longest-tenured actors in American soap operas. Former cast member Rachel Ames was previously the series' longest-running cast member, portraying Audrey Hardy from 1964 to 2007, and making guest appearances in 2009 and 2013, the latter for the series' fiftieth anniversary. Ames made a special appearance on October 30, 2015. Actors Genie Francis and Kin Shriner, who portray Laura Spencer and Scott Baldwin, are the second and third longest-running cast members, having joined General Hospital in February and August 1977, respectively. Actress Jacklyn Zeman — who portrays Bobbie Spencer — is the fourth longest-running cast member, joining the serial in December 1977. Actress Jane Elliot, who joined the serial in June 1978 as Tracy Quartermaine, is the fifth longest-running cast member, joining General Hospital in June 1978. Past cast member Anthony Geary, who portrayed Luke Spencer, was the sixth longest-running cast member, having joined General Hospital in November 1978. The following list is of cast members who are currently on the show: the main and recurring cast members, or those who are debuting, departing or returning to the series.

Cast

Main cast

Recurring and guest cast

Cast changes

Returning cast

See also
List of previous General Hospital cast members
List of General Hospital characters

References

Citations

External links
SoapCentral.com GH "Comings and Goings"
IMDb.com "Full Cast and Crew for General Hospital"

General Hospital
General Hospital